Roumare is a commune in the Seine-Maritime department in the Normandy region in northern France.

Geography
The junction of the A150 autoroute with the A151 lies entirely within the commune's territory.

Population

Places of interest
 The church of Notre-Dame, dating from the fifteenth century.
 The sixteenth-century château and its chapel.

See also
Communes of the Seine-Maritime department

References

Communes of Seine-Maritime